Andrzej Leszek Szcześniak (November 29, 1932 – March 15, 2003) was a controversial Polish doctor of historical sciences, author of over thirty historical books and school textbooks. While he was praised for his research of the Katyn massacre, he was also accused of anti-Semitism.

Research in Katyń massacre 
Szcześniak was among the first who raised the issue of the Katyń massacre in the mid-1980s and published several books on the subject.

Accusations of anti-Semitism 
Szcześniak is known for reviving the conspiracy theory of Judeopolonia, authoring two volumes under this title, which present Jews as "informers and spies for the tsar, tightfisted hyenas and arrogant sassy people who oppress the Polish people."

Polish journalist Anna Bikont writes that during the Communist times he had a near-monopoly on the history textbooks, but with the fall of Communism he switched the rhetoric in the textbooks from Communist to nationalist. She writes that she raised the issue of anti-Semitism in his textbooks in her articles Gazeta Wyborcza, which caused public protests by over 200 prominent people against using these textbooks in education, but an equally large group defended his textbooks for the "Polish values" in them. She cites him saying on the occasion of Jedwabne Massacre that "The hysteria around Jedwabne is aimed at shocking Poles and extracting sixty-five billion dollars from our people in the framework of the Holocaust business".

Books 
 Katyń: lista ofiar i zaginionych jeńców obozów Kozielsk, Ostaszków, Starobielsk, Alfa, Warsaw, 1989, .
 Katyń: relacje, wspomnienia, publicystyka, Alfa, Warsaw, 1989, .
 Katyń. Tło historyczne, fakty, dokumenty, Alfa, Warsaw, 1989, .
 Wojna polsko-radziecka 1918-1920, Wyd. Ośrodka Dokumentacji i Studiów Społecznych, Warsaw, 1989, .
 Zmowa. IV rozbiór Polski, Alfa, Warsaw, 1990, .
 Judeopolonia. Żydowskie państwo w państwie polskim, Radom, 2001, .
 Plan zagłady Słowian – Generalplan Ost, Polskie Wydawnictwo Encyklopedyczne, Radom, 2001,.
 Holokaust. Wyd. Polskie Wydawnictwo Encyklopedyczne, Radom, 2001, .
 Judeopolonia II - Anatomia Zniewolenia Polski, Polskie Wydawnictwo Encyklopedyczne, Radom, 2002, .
 Deportacje w XX wieku, Polskie Wydawnictwo Encyklopedyczne, Radom, 2002, .
 Katyńska zbrodnia, Polskie Wydawnictwo Encyklopedyczne Polwen, Radom, 2004,

References 

1932 births
2003 deaths
20th-century Polish historians
Polish male non-fiction writers
Antisemitism in Poland
Katyn massacre investigators